Aischbach may refer to:

Aischbach (Kinzig), a river of Baden-Württemberg, Germany, tributary of the Kinzig
Aischbach (Körsch), a river of Baden-Württemberg, Germany, left headstream of the Körsch